A list of episodes for Charlie's Angels (1976–1981).

Series overview

Episodes

Pilot (1976)

Season 1 (1976–77)

Season 2 (1977–78)

Season 3 (1978–79)

Season 4 (1979–80)

Season 5 (1980–81)

References

Charlie's Angels (franchise)
Lists of American action television series episodes